The 1992–93 QMJHL season was the 24th season in the history of the Quebec Major Junior Hockey League. The league inaugurates the Ron Lapointe Trophy, for the "Coach of the Year," and the QMJHL Humanitarian of the Year award. Twelve teams played 70 games each in the schedule. The Sherbrooke Faucons finished first overall in the regular season winning the Jean Rougeau Trophy. The Laval Titan won their third President's Cup, defeating Sherbrooke in the finals.

Team changes
 The Trois-Rivières Draveurs relocated to Sherbrooke, Quebec, becoming the Sherbrooke Faucons.

Final standings
Note: GP = Games played; W = Wins; L = Losses; T = Ties; Pts = Points; GF = Goals for; GA = Goals against

Complete list of standings

Scoring leaders
Note: GP = Games played; G = Goals; A = Assists; Pts = Points; PIM = Penalties in Minutes

 Complete scoring statistics

Playoffs
Martin Lapointe was the leading scorer of the playoffs with 30 points (13 goals, 17 assists).

All-star teams
First team
 Goaltender - Jocelyn Thibault, Sherbrooke Faucons
 Left defence - Benoit Larose, Laval Titan  
 Right defence - Stephane Julien, Sherbrooke Faucons
 Left winger - Rene Corbet, Drummondville Voltigeurs  
 Centreman - Alexandre Daigle, Victoriaville Tigres 
 Right winger - Martin Lapointe, Laval Titan     
 Coach - Guy Chouinard, Sherbrooke Faucons

Second team
 Goaltender - Philippe DeRouville, Verdun Collège Français   
 Left defence - Steve Gosselin, Chicoutimi Saguenéens   
 Right defence - Yan Arsenault, Verdun Collège Français
 Left winger - Michel St. Jacques, Chicoutimi Saguenéens 
 Centreman - Ian Laperriere, Drummondville Voltigeurs 
 Right winger - Martin Gendron, Saint-Hyacinthe Laser 
 Coach - Bob Hartley, Laval Titan

Rookie team
 Goaltender - Stephane Routhier, Drummondville Voltigeurs
 Left defence - Sebastien Bety, Drummondville Voltigeurs
 Right defence - Christian Laflamme, Verdun Collège Français
 Left winger - Jean-Yves Leroux, Beauport Harfangs  
 Centreman - Steve Brûlé, Saint-Jean Lynx 
 Right winger - Christian Matte, Granby Bisons
 Coach - Alain Rajotte, Verdun Collège Français

List of First/Second/Rookie team all-stars

Trophies and awards
Team
President's Cup - Playoff Champions, Laval Titan
Jean Rougeau Trophy - Regular Season Champions, Sherbrooke Faucons
Robert Lebel Trophy - Team with best GAA, Sherbrooke Faucons

Player
Michel Brière Memorial Trophy - Most Valuable Player, Jocelyn Thibault, Sherbrooke Faucons
Jean Béliveau Trophy - Top Scorer, Rene Corbet, Drummondville Voltigeurs  
Guy Lafleur Trophy - Playoff MVP, Emmanuel Fernandez, Laval Titan 
Shell Cup – Offensive - Offensive Player of the Year, Rene Corbet, Drummondville Voltigeurs  
Shell Cup – Defensive - Defensive Player of the Year, Jocelyn Thibault, Sherbrooke Faucons 
Transamerica Plaque - Best plus/minus total, Claude Savoie, Victoriaville Tigres 
Jacques Plante Memorial Trophy - Best GAA, Jocelyn Thibault, Sherbrooke Faucons
Emile Bouchard Trophy - Defenceman of the Year, Benoit Larose, Laval Titan 
Mike Bossy Trophy - Best Pro Prospect, Alexandre Daigle, Victoriaville Tigres
Molson Cup - Rookie of the Year, Ian Laperriere, Drummondville Voltigeurs & Martin Lapointe, Laval Titan
Michel Bergeron Trophy - Offensive Rookie of the Year, Steve Brûlé, Saint-Jean Lynx
Raymond Lagacé Trophy - Defensive Rookie of the Year, Stephane Routhier, Drummondville Voltigeurs
Frank J. Selke Memorial Trophy - Most sportsmanlike player, Martin Gendron, Saint-Hyacinthe Laser
QMJHL Humanitarian of the Year - Humanitarian of the Year, Jean Nadeau, Shawinigan Cataractes
Marcel Robert Trophy - Best Scholastic Player, Jocelyn Thibault, Sherbrooke Faucons   
Paul Dumont Trophy - Personality of the Year, Martin Lapointe, Laval Titan

Executive
Ron Lapointe Trophy - Coach of the Year, Guy Chouinard, Sherbrooke Faucons
John Horman Trophy - Executive of the Year, Georges Marien, Saint-Jean Lynx   
St-Clair Group Plaque - Marketing Director of the Year, Stephane Tousignant, Drummondville Voltigeurs

See also
1993 Memorial Cup
1993 NHL Entry Draft
1992–93 OHL season
1992–93 WHL season

References
 Official QMJHL Website
 www.hockeydb.com/

Quebec Major Junior Hockey League seasons
QMJHL